The 2015 Dubai Tennis Championships (also known as the 2015 Dubai Duty Free Tennis Championships for sponsorship reasons) was an ATP 500 event on the 2015 ATP World Tour and a WTA Premier 5 on the 2015 WTA Tour. Both events were held at the Aviation Club Tennis Centre in Dubai, United Arab Emirates. The women's tournament took place from February 15 to 21, 2015, while the men's tournament took place from February 23 to 28, 2015.

Points and prize money

Point distribution

Prize money

*per team

ATP singles main-draw entrants

Seeds 

 Rankings are as of February 16, 2015.

Other entrants
The following players received wildcards into the singles main draw:
  Marcos Baghdatis
  James McGee
  Alexander Zverev

The following players received entry from the qualifying draw:
  Marsel İlhan
  Fabrice Martin
  Lucas Pouille
  James Ward

The following player received entry as a lucky loser:
  Borna Ćorić

Withdrawals
Before the tournament
  Philipp Kohlschreiber (illness) → replaced by  Borna Ćorić
  Nick Kyrgios (back injury) → replaced by  Sergiy Stakhovsky

Retirements
  Marcos Baghdatis (cramping)
  Richard Gasquet (lower back pain)

ATP doubles main-draw entrants

Seeds 

 Rankings are as of February 16, 2015.

Other entrants
The following pairs received wildcards into the doubles main draw:
  Laslo Djere /  Novak Djokovic
  Roger Federer /  Michael Lammer

The following pair received entry from the qualifying draw:
  Jamie Murray /  John Peers

The following pair received entry as lucky losers:
  Andrey Golubev /  Denis Istomin

Withdrawals
Before the tournament
  Philipp Kohlschreiber (illness)

WTA singles main-draw entrants

Seeds 

 Rankings are as of February 9, 2015.

Other entrants
The following players received wildcards into the singles main draw:
  Eugenie Bouchard
  Çağla Büyükakçay
  Casey Dellacqua
  Daniela Hantuchová
  Flavia Pennetta

The following player received entry using a protected ranking into the singles main draw:
  Vera Zvonareva

The following players received entry from the qualifying draw:
  Tímea Babos
  Yuliya Beygelzimer
  Gabriela Dabrowski
  Jarmila Gajdošová
  Kateryna Kozlova
  Mirjana Lučić-Baroni
  Arina Rodionova
  Wang Qiang

The following players received entry as lucky losers:
  Julia Görges
  Kateřina Siniaková
  Elena Vesnina

Withdrawals
Before the tournament
  Eugenie Bouchard (arm injury) → replaced by  Kateřina Siniaková
  Dominika Cibulková → replaced by  Elena Vesnina
  Varvara Lepchenko → replaced by  Monica Puig
  Serena Williams (illness) → replaced by  Julia Görges

Retirements
  Kaia Kanepi
  CoCo Vandeweghe

WTA doubles main-draw entrants

Seeds 

 Rankings are as of February 9, 2015.

Other entrants
The following pair received a wildcard into the doubles main draw:
  Fatma Al-Nabhani /  Mona Barthel

The following pair received entry as alternates:
  Aleksandrina Naydenova /  Evgeniya Rodina

Withdrawals
Before the tournament
  Karin Knapp (illness)

Champions

Men's singles

  Roger Federer def.  Novak Djokovic, 6–3, 7–5

Women's singles

  Simona Halep def.  Karolína Plíšková, 6–4, 7–6(7–4)

Men's doubles

  Rohan Bopanna /  Daniel Nestor def.  Aisam-ul-Haq Qureshi /  Nenad Zimonjić, 6–4, 6–1

Women's doubles

  Tímea Babos /  Kristina Mladenovic def.  Garbiñe Muguruza /  Carla Suárez Navarro, 6–3, 6–2

References

External links
 Official website

 
2015
Dubai Tennis Championships
Dubai Tennis Championships
Dubai Tennis Championships
Dubai Tennis Championships